The TV Câmara Jacareí is a legislative TV channel that belongs to Câmara Municipal de Jacareí, located in the countryside of São Paulo State.  This TV is broadcasting in open signal, for 24 hours every day, on 61.4 UHF, and on channels 17 and 27 of the cable TV NET, and it is also possible to watch its programs on Câmara's website.

Television networks in Brazil
Legislature broadcasters
Television stations in Brazil